Mines of Titan is a single-player role-playing video game, developed by Westwood Associates (later Westwood Studios), and released by Infocom in 1989 for Apple II, Commodore 64 and MS-DOS.

Remake
Mines of Titan is a remake, or update, of the Commodore 64 game Mars Saga. Mines of Titan is lengthier, with some new storylines, a few more creatures and a few details like colors are different. And of course the game's location is moved from Mars to Titan. The cities and maps look the same.

Plot
Mines of Titan is set in the year 2261, well into the era of mankind's colonization the inner Solar System. The game takes place on a barely terraformed Titan, the largest moon of the gas giant Saturn, at the edge of frontier space.

The player character is a charismatic 22-year-old astronaut Tom Jetland, who has crashed on Titan after bullet-sized rocks from the Rings of Saturn pierced his ship's hull. Forced to eject payload and has no means of transport off the world. In order to raise money, Jetland must search for, recruit, create and control a party of characters ready for exploration and combat. The player develops Jetland and other characters by improving their natural attributes and by adding and training in over twenty new skills which will aid in both the central quest and various side missions.

Success depends upon competence in battle with various creatures and human foes alike; exploration of underground colonies and mining settlements; using characters' skills to their best advantage; utilising a wide array of weaponry and aid acquired from merchants; and most importantly tracking down the clues to solve the mysteries of Titan. For only by uncovering a vast conspiracy and learning the fate of the disappeared Proscenium Colony (presumably named after the Proscenium "archway" of a theatrical stage) will the player be able to raise enough credits to pay for safe passage off Titan.

Feelies

Infocom often released their games with merchandise referred to as feelies. Mines of Titan originally came on floppy disk format which was provided in a secret agent-style packaging, which also contained a thirty-seven page manual and various paraphernalia, such as a "command reference card"; supposedly secret classified military and scientific documents; weapons schematics; illustrations of alien lifeforms; and hidden maps, all connected with the game. The more expensive game packages had small figurines. These box sets are now extremely rare.

Reception
The game was reviewed in 1990 in Dragon #154 by Hartley, Patricia, and Kirk Lesser in "The Role of Computers" column. The reviewers gave the game 5 out of 5 stars. In 2006, abandonware website Abandonias Romano reviewed Mines of Titan with "I am kind of disappointed in the game – the sinister, futuristic setting could have made up a great game, but the developers wasted all their work because of some major downgrades like the battle system and lack of sound."

Reviews
Info (Jan, 1989)
ACE (Advanced Computer Entertainment) (Mar, 1989)
The Games Machine (Feb, 1990)
Zzap! (Jan, 1989)
Power Play (Dec, 1988)
Joker Verlag präsentiert: Sonderheft (1992)
ASM (Aktueller Software Markt) (Jan, 1990)
ASM (Aktueller Software Markt) (Jan, 1989)
Australian Commodore and Amiga Review (Apr, 1989)

References

External links

Mines of Titan at GameSpot

1989 video games
Apple II games
DOS games
Infocom games
Role-playing video games
Single-player video games
Video game remakes
Video games developed in the United States
Video games set on Titan (moon)
Westwood Studios games